Owsaluy, also rendered as Owsalu or Usalu, may refer to:
 Owsaluy-e Allahverdi Khan
 Owsaluy-e Kazem